Lemyra everetti is a moth of the family Erebidae first described by Walter Rothschild in 1910. It is found on Flores in Indonesia.

References

Moths described in 1910
everetti